Nottoway High School is a public high school located  in Nottoway County, Virginia. It is part of the Nottoway County School Division.  Athletic teams compete in the Virginia High School League's AA James River District in the VHSL 2A East division Conference 34.

Notable alumni
 Maurice Anderson, American football player
 Michael Hawkes, American football player
 Robert Jones, NFL Pro Bowl linebacker

References

External links
Official site

Schools in Nottoway County, Virginia
Public high schools in Virginia